The Colchester Village Historic District encompasses most of the historic village center of Colchester, Connecticut. It is located at the junction of Route 16, Route 85, and Norwich Avenue (old Route 2). Roughly, the district extends to the northwest along Broadway Street (Route 85) as far as Jaffe Terrace; east along Norwich Avenue to just short of Pleasant Street; south along South Main Street to just north of Hall Hill Road; west along Linwood Avenue (Route 16) to just east of Kmick Lane.  The historic district was listed on the National Register of Historic Places (NRHP) in 1994.

The Colchester Town Green is located at the center of the district. Several commercial, residential and civic buildings mostly from the 19th century, surround the green, with the Colchester Federated Church in the Greek Revival style and the Bacon Academy (built in 1803 and separately listed on the NRHP) being the dominant structures. The Hayward House (built in 1767 and separately listed on the NRHP) is located on Hayward Avenue across the street from the green and is now being used as a bed and breakfast. Wheeler Block, the original town hall and also listed separately on the NRHP, is located across the green to the south on Norwich Avenue.

Colchester was incorporated in 1698, and was at first a dispersed agricultural community.  The village center formed around the town's first colonial meeting house and burying ground, with the area's economic importance later cemented by its location as a crossroads of several early 19th century turnpikes.  Bacon Academy was founded in 1803 as the region's first secondary school, and the town was home to the first Masonic lodge in the region (founded 1782).  In the second half of the 19th century, the village benefited from the rise of small industries, prompting the construction of a number of commercial buildings, including the fine Second Empire Wheeler Block.

See also
National Register of Historic Places listings in New London County, Connecticut

References

External links

 and 

Colchester, Connecticut
Historic districts in New London County, Connecticut
National Register of Historic Places in New London County, Connecticut
Historic districts on the National Register of Historic Places in Connecticut